Andrés Fontecilla (born 20 September 1967) is a Canadian politician from Quebec. He was elected to the National Assembly of Quebec in the 2018 provincial election, representing the electoral district of Laurier-Dorion as a member of Québec solidaire.

He was co-spokesperson of the party, along with Françoise David, from 2013 to 2017.

Biography
Fontecilla was born in Chile but emigrated to Canada in 1981, having fled the authoritarian regime of Augusto Pinochet.

He completed a degree in anthropology at the University of Montreal, and was elected president of the student association for his department.

Political career
Fontecilla was a member of the Quebec provincial party Union des forces progressistes (UFP) since its foundation and ran as the party's candidate in a 2004 by-election for the National Assembly of Quebec, but finished a distant third. In 2006 the UFP and Option citoyenne merged to form Québec solidaire. Fontecilla ran for Québec solidaire in the 2012 Quebec general election, finishing in third place. On 5 May 2013 he was chosen to be co-spokesperson of the party along with Françoise David.

He was again defeated in the 2014 Quebec general election, but won in 2018.

Electoral record

* Result compared to Action démocratique

References

External links 

1967 births
Chilean emigrants to Canada
Living people
Politicians from Montreal
People from
Québec solidaire MNAs
Quebec political party leaders
Université de Montréal alumni
21st-century Canadian politicians
Place of birth missing (living people)